Curve-fitting compaction is  data compaction accomplished by replacing data to be stored or transmitted with an analytical expression.

Examples of curve-fitting compaction consisting of discretization and then interpolation are:
 Breaking of a continuous curve into a series of straight line segments and specifying the slope, intercept, and range for each segment  
 Using a mathematical expression, such as a polynomial or a trigonometric function, and a single point on the corresponding curve instead of storing or transmitting the entire graphic curve or a series of points on it.

References

Curves
Interpolation
Data compression